Houston is a city in Texas County, Missouri, United States. The population was 2,079 at the 2020 census. It is the county seat of Texas County.

History
Houston was founded in 1857 and was named after Sam Houston.

During the Civil War, Houston was sometimes defended by units of the 5th Missouri State Militia.

The Arthur W. and Chloe B. Cole House, Houston High School, and Houston Ranger Station Historic District are listed on the National Register of Historic Places.

Geography
Houston is located in the Missouri Ozarks in central Texas County, at the intersection of U.S. Route 63 and Missouri Route 17. Cabool is approximately 15 miles to the southwest and Licking about 12 miles to the northeast on route 63.

Houston is the second-largest city in Texas County, behind Cabool. The town is located south of Rolla.

Climate

Demographics

2010 census
As of the census of 2010, there were 2,081 people, 935 households, and 513 families living in the city. The racial makeup of the city was 96.3% White, 0.2% African American, 0.6% Native American, 0.4% Asian, 0.5% from other races, and 1.9% from two or more races. Hispanic or Latino of any race were 1.2% of the population.

There were 935 households, of which 28.4% had children under the age of 18 living with them, 37.4% were married couples living together, 13.6% had a female householder with no husband present, 3.9% had a male householder with no wife present, and 45.1% were non-families. 41.0% of all households were made up of individuals, and 21.2% had someone living alone who was 65 years of age or older. The average household size was 2.08 and the average family size was 2.78.

The median age in the city was 41.9 years. 21.7% of residents were under the age of 18; 8.4% were between the ages of 18 and 24; 22.3% were from 25 to 44; 22.7% were from 45 to 64; and 24.7% were 65 years of age or older. The gender makeup of the city was 44.0% male and 56.0% female.

2000 census
As of the census of 2000, there were 1,992 people, 904 households, and 536 families living in the city. The population density was 559.8 people per square mile (216.0/km2). There were 1,042 housing units at an average density of 292.8 per square mile (113.0/km2). The racial makeup of the city was 96.13% White, 0.20% African American, 0.80% Native American, 0.30% Asian, 0.35% from other races, and 2.21% from two or more races. Hispanic or Latino of any race were 1.46% of the population.

There were 904 households, out of which 25.3% had children under the age of 18 living with them, 43.6% were married couples living together, 12.3% had a female householder with no husband present, and 40.6% were non-families. 37.7% of all households were made up of individuals, and 22.6% had someone living alone who was 65 years of age or older. The average household size was 2.07 and the average family size was 2.67.

In the city, the population was spread out, with 20.7% under the age of 18, 7.4% from 18 to 24, 22.2% from 25 to 44, 22.3% from 45 to 64, and 27.4% who were 65 years of age or older. The median age was 45 years. For every 100 females, there were 73.7 males. For every 100 females age 18 and over, there were 69.1 males.

The median income for a household in the city was $20,886, and the median income for a family was $28,798. Males had a median income of $26,371 versus $17,500 for females. The per capita income for the city was $14,977. About 20.6% of families and 26.2% of the population were below the poverty line, including 34.9% of those under age 18 and 19.8% of those age 65 or over.

Education
Houston R-I School District operates one elementary school, one middle school, and Houston High School.

Houston has a public library, a branch of the Texas County Library.

References

External links
 Historic maps of Houston in the Sanborn Maps of Missouri Collection at the University of Missouri

Cities in Texas County, Missouri
County seats in Missouri
Cities in Missouri
Populated places established in 1857
1857 establishments in Missouri
Sam Houston